This is a list of Renault one-make racing cups champions. Since year 2000 they are commonly named as Renault Clio Cups.

Champions

Renault Gordini cups

Renault 5 cups

Renault Clio (first generation) and Mégane cups

Renault Clio (II-III) cups

Renault Clio (IV-V) cups

Other cups

See also
 Renault Clio Cup#Chronology and cars used
 Dacia Logan Cup
 Formula Renault
 :es:Copa Nacional Renault
 :es:Copa Mégane Argentina
 :fr:Clio Cup France
 :fr:Coupe de France Renault
 :nl:Renault Clio Cup
 :de:New Renault Clio Cup

References

External links
DriverDB
Latest News – Heritage:'Last Ever' Renault 5 Race On Motors TV This Friday Renaultsport.co.uk
Cup Racers renaultoloog.nl

Renault Clio Cup
One-make series
Touring car racing series